Kirtie Ramdas (born 1980 in Leiden) is a Dutch television presenter and actress of Indo-Surinamese descent and mostly known for her work for the Dutch TV show  for the OHM and television presenter for  for the NTR. Currently she is in a TV commercial for Bonduelle and presents OHM Magazine for the OHM.

Biography

Ramdas is a daughter of two teachers. Her parents emigrated from Suriname to the Netherlands in the late 1960s for educational purposes. She was educated at the Grammar School  in Leiden and then studied Medicine at the Leiden University. She obtained her master's degree in 2002 and graduated as a medical doctor in 2004.

She worked as a medical doctor in the field of surgery and plastic surgery, whilst working in the media as well, as a radio host for the urban radio station FunX and presenting various TV-programmes, acting in short movies and as a highlight presenting the Welcoming Event of International Indian Film Academy Awards in Amsterdam in 2005.

References

External links 
 School TV
 OHM
 Beeld en Geluid Archive

1980 births
Living people
Dutch television presenters
Dutch people of Surinamese descent
Dutch people of Indian descent
Dutch plastic surgeons
People from Leiden
Women surgeons